Dalmannia is a genus of flies from the family Conopidae.

Species
Dalmannia aculeata (Linnaeus, 1758, 1761)
Dalmannia blaisdelli Cresson, 1919
Dalmannia confusa Becker, 1923
Dalmannia dorsalis (Fabricius, 1794)
Dalmannia heterotricha Bohart, 1938
Dalmannia marginata (Meigen, 1824)
Dalmannia nigriceps Loew, 1866
Dalmannia pacifica Banks, 1916
Dalmannia picta Williston, 1883
Dalmannia punctata (Fabricius, 1794)
Dalmannia vitiosa Coquillett, 1892

References

Conopidae
Conopoidea genera